Russell Scott Riggs (born January 1, 1971) is an American professional stock car racing  driver. He last competed in the  92 for RBR Enterprises in the NASCAR Camping World Truck Series.

Racing career

Early career
Riggs was born in Bahama, North Carolina, and began his racing career at the age of fourteen in the American Motorcycle Association, where he won the State Championship in North Carolina two years in a row. At the age of 17, he began racing the NASCAR mini stock division, and won twelve races over his first three seasons. He continued to race in that series over the next decade, and was a two-time champion at Southern National Speedway.

In 1999, Riggs made his major-league NASCAR debut in the Craftsman Truck Series at Indianapolis Raceway Park, driving the No. 84 for Long Brothers Racing. He started seventh and finished 19th. He also competed at Richmond International Raceway, where he finished 23rd. In 2000, he finished ninth at Martinsville Speedway for Long, when he was hired to drive the No. 86 Dodge Ram for Impact Motorsports, where he had seven Top 10's. Towards the end of the season, he was released from Impact, and competed in one final race at California Speedway for Brevak Racing, finishing 16th. The following season, he drove for Ultra Motorsports, where he picked up five wins, the first coming at Martinsville. He finished fifth in points at the end of the season.

Nationwide Series
In 2002, Riggs moved to the Busch Series (now Xfinity Series) to drive the No. 10 Ford Taurus for ppc Racing. He won his first race at Nashville Superspeedway, then won again two weeks later at California. He finished 10th in points at the end of the season, earning him Rookie of the Year honors. The next season, he picked up two more wins including a thrilling last-lap pass for a victory at Gateway International Raceway after Mike Bliss ran out of gas just after the white flag, scored the other win at Nashville, and finished sixth in points as part of the Top 6 going for the title at Homestead, but his hopes ended after he crashed after the start of the race. He also won the Most Popular Driver award.

Riggs returned to the NASCAR Nationwide Series in 2010 to drive the No. 09 Ford Fusion for RAB Racing with Brack Maggard.  After the February 27 race at Las Vegas, Riggs sat 10th in the series point standings. However, despite strong and consistent runs, Riggs was unable to bring sponsorship to the team and was released after the Nashville 300. On May 28, 2010, Riggs signed with Richard Childress Racing to drive the No. 21 Chevrolet Impala for the Federated Auto Parts 300 at Nashville Superspeedway and for the Meijer 300 at Kentucky Speedway, while sharing duties with Clint Bowyer for the remainder of the season. At Nashville, Riggs recorded his first Top 10 of the season, finishing ninth. He also finished 9th at Kentucky. In 2011, Riggs made 12 starts in the Nationwide Series for R3 Motorsports, with a best finish of 13th at Darlington.

Sprint Cup Series

In 2004, Riggs signed to drive the No. 10 Chevrolet Monte Carlo for MB2 Motorsports. Qualifying for all but one race that season, he had a fifth-place finish at Dover International Speedway and finished 29th in points, fifth in the Rookie of the Year standings. In 2005, he won his first pole at Martinsville, and went on to have a second-place finish at Michigan International Speedway.

At the end of the year, Riggs and Valvoline left for Evernham Motorsports taking the No. 10 with him. In 2006, Riggs failed to make the Daytona 500 because of a mechanical error in qualifying and a lack of owner points from the previous season (from the former No. 91 team). The No. 10 team finished the 2006 season high enough in owners' points to guarantee themselves a starting spot in the first five races in 2007. Riggs had back-to-back Top 10 finishes at Martinsville and Texas. Riggs also won the pole for the Coca-Cola 600 and the NEXTEL Open exhibition race at Charlotte.  He won the NEXTEL Open, leading all but one lap, and advanced to the NEXTEL All-Star Challenge where he finished tenth.  In the Coca-Cola 600, Riggs led 90 laps, but a pit road violation took him out of contention and he finished 13th.  His highest ranking in the 2006 NEXTEL Cup points standings has been 18th. Riggs's best finish in the 2006 Nextel Cup season was a fourth-place finish which came at the Sharpie 500 at Bristol Motor Speedway. Riggs won the pole in the Bank of America 500, sweeping both poles at Charlotte.

Riggs struggled in 2007, falling out of the Top 35 in owner's points, and began failing to qualify for several races. During the summer, Riggs did not renew his contract with Evernham, and on October 3, 2007 it was revealed that Riggs had signed a contract to drive Haas CNC Racing's No. 66 Chevrolet for the 2008 season. He was replaced in the No. 10 car for the last two races of 2007 by Patrick Carpentier.

Riggs was released from Haas CNC when that team signed Tony Stewart and became Stewart-Haas Racing. Riggs joined Tommy Baldwin Racing to drive the No. 36 Toyota Camry in the 2009 NASCAR Sprint Cup Series. After qualifying for eight races, including the 2009 Daytona 500, Riggs announced that he was parting ways with TBR, refusing to be a start-and-park driver.  He was replaced in favor of Mike Skinner, Brian Simo, and Patrick Carpentier.

On March 30, 2010, it was announced Riggs would drive the No. 90 Chevrolet Impala for Keyed-Up Motorsports on an initial two race contract, taking over from Casey Mears who moved to Joe Gibbs Racing as a standby driver for Denny Hamlin. Riggs was running 25th on the lead lap in the Subway Fresh Fit 600 at Phoenix, but he blew a right-front tire with four laps to go and pounded the turn 3 wall, forcing a green-white-checkered finish. Riggs went on to finish 28th. Due to sponsorship reasons, Keyed-Up Motorsports announced they would not return to the Sprint Cup Series until they had enough funds to run entire races.

Riggs drove for Whitney Motorsports in four races in 2011. However, after four DNQ's, he was released from the team. He has made several attempts to qualify in the R3 Motorsports No. 23 in late 2011 and 2012.

In 2013, he announced that would begin driving for Xxxtreme Motorsport in the No. 44 Ford Fusion, with sponsorship from No Label Watches, hendrickcars.com, and Everest College. He made his debut at Phoenix, finishing 43rd after blowing a tire.

Personal life 
Riggs' son Layne currently competes in the CARS Late Model Stock Tour. And is scheduled to make his first NASCAR Truck series start at IRP for Halmar Friesen Racing in 2022.

Motorsports career results

NASCAR
(key) (Bold – Pole position awarded by qualifying time. Italics – Pole position earned by points standings or practice time. * – Most laps led.)

Sprint Cup Series

Daytona 500

Nationwide Series

Camping World Truck Series

Winston West Series

Corona Series

ARCA Re/Max Series
(key) (Bold – Pole position awarded by qualifying time. Italics – Pole position earned by points standings or practice time. * – Most laps led.)

 Season still in progress
 Ineligible for series points

References

External links
 
 

Living people
1971 births
People from Durham County, North Carolina
Racing drivers from North Carolina
NASCAR drivers
Louisburg College alumni
ARCA Menards Series drivers
Evernham Motorsports drivers
Stewart-Haas Racing drivers
Richard Childress Racing drivers